The 33rd World Science Fiction Convention (Worldcon), also known as Aussiecon, or Aussiecon One, was held on 14–17 August 1975 at the Southern Cross Hotel in Melbourne, Australia.

The chairman was Robin Johnson.

Aussiecon was significant in the development of cohesive Australian activity around science fiction and fantasy fandom.

Participants 

Attendance was 606.

Guests of Honour 

 Ursula K. Le Guin (pro)
 Susan Wood (fan)
 Mike Glicksohn (fan)
 Donald Tuck (Australian)
 John Bangsund (toastmaster)

Awards

1975 Hugo Awards 

 Best Novel: The Dispossessed by Ursula K. Le Guin
 Best Novella: "A Song for Lya" by George R. R. Martin
 Best Novelette: "Adrift Just Off the Islets of Langerhans: Latitude 38° 54′ N, Longitude 77° 00′ 13″ W" by Harlan Ellison
 Best Short Story: "The Hole Man" by Larry Niven
 Best Dramatic Presentation: Young Frankenstein
 Best Professional Editor: Ben Bova
 Best Professional Artist: Frank Kelly Freas
 Best Amateur Magazine: The Alien Critic, edited by Richard E. Geis
 Best Fan Writer: Richard E. Geis
 Best Fan Artist: Bill Rotsler

Other awards 

 Special Award: Donald A. Wollheim as "the fan who has done everything"
 Special Award: Walt Lee for Reference Guide to Fantastic Films
 John W. Campbell Award for Best New Writer: P. J. Plauger
 Gandalf Grand Master Award: Fritz Leiber

See also 

 Aussiecon Two (1985)
 Aussiecon Three (1999)
 Aussiecon Four (2010)
 Hugo Award
 Science fiction
 Speculative fiction
 World Science Fiction Society
 Worldcon

References

External links 

 NESFA.org: The Long List
 NESFA.org: 1975 convention notes 

1970s in Melbourne
1975 conferences
1975 in Australia
Science fiction conventions in Australia
Worldcon